The Denver Star (1888–1963), established as The Statesman and also known as Franklin's Paper, The Statesman, was an American weekly newspaper for the African American community. It was published in Denver, Colorado and was distributed in Colorado, Wyoming, Montana, Utah, and New Mexico.

History 
The newspaper was founded as the "The Statesman" in 1888, by Joseph D. D. Rivers. From 1901 until 1913, the paper was renamed to the "Franklin's Paper, The Statesman". In November 1912, the paper was renamed "The Denver Star".

Joseph D. D. Rivers was the first owner of the newspaper, followed by Edwin H. Hackley (1892–1898); George F. Franklin (1898–1901); after his death his wife, Clara Williams Franklin and her son, Chester Arthur Franklin who ran the newspaper (1901–1913); followed by Albert Henderson Wade Ross (or A.H.W. Ross) and the Denver Independent Publishing Company (1913–1963).

Many of the owners of the newspaper also served as its editor. Editors of the newspaper included Joseph D. D. Rivers, Charles Segret Muse, Edwin H. Hackley, and Azalia Smith Hackley. In 1917, George G. Ross was an associate editor and business manager.

Archived editions of the paper are extant at Chronicling America, Newspapers.com, and at the Denver Public Library.

See also
Denver White Elephants
Rossonian Hotel

References

Defunct African-American newspapers
1888 establishments in Colorado
1963 disestablishments in Colorado
Defunct newspapers published in Colorado
Weekly newspapers published in the United States